Deeplink is the developer of deeplink.me, a deep linking platform that drives URLs to content within mobile apps.

History 

Deeplink was founded in 2013 for mobile users to navigate across installed apps.

Mobile software startup Cellogic, while developing the content-discovery network Nextap, recognized the need for a deep linking service. Using US$1.35 million in seed funding from Prolific Venture Capital, they designed and launched Deeplink in May 2013.

Product 

The Deeplink platform promotes customer engagement and re-engagement. When a user encounters a hyperlink referring via deeplink.me to a new app, it drives the user to install the app. By providing external links in other media that redirect the user back into the already installed app, those customers are considered re-engaged.

Deeplinks can be used in email marketing campaigns, with social media, or with QR codes.

It also has a re-targeting network to deliver advertisements based on the apps installed on the user's device. It can redirect users to a specific page within an app based on user data, or bring them back into an abandoned cart or a product page.

Deeplink offers a certain amount of links for free on a monthly basis, and then a gradually increasing cost for higher click-through volumes. Customers may choose a volume cap (including in the free level), beyond which the "deep" aspect of the link is disabled, and links are re-directed to a customer-specified fallback URL.

Companies using the Deeplink platform include 
Shazam, JackThreads, and OpenTable. In March 2015, Deeplink.me launched AppWords, a Deep Linking ad platform for complementary apps.

See also
 Tech companies in the New York metropolitan area

References

External links 
deeplink.me site

Information technology companies of Israel
Privately held companies based in New York City
Software companies based in New York City
Companies based in Tel Aviv
Defunct software companies of the United States